The 2006 United States Open Championship was the 106th U.S. Open, held June 15–18 at Winged Foot Golf Club West Course in Mamaroneck, New York, a suburb northeast of New York City.

Geoff Ogilvy won his only major title by one stroke in one of the wildest finishes in U.S. Open  He made clutch pars on the final two holes, including a chip-in on 17. Runners-up Jim Furyk, Colin Montgomerie, and Phil Mickelson all failed to par the 72nd hole. In the final pairing and seeking his third straight major championship, Mickelson double-bogeyed the final hole after hitting driver off the tee and failing to hit the fairway. Montgomerie double-bogeyed the same hole when his approach shot from the fairway ended up short and in the rough, then followed the difficult chip with three putts. Furyk bogeyed the 15th hole and then missed a 5-footer for par at the final hole.  All players finished over par for the first time in a U.S. Open since 1978.  The total purse was $6.25 million with a winner's share of $1.225 million.

History of the U.S. Open at Winged Foot
This was the fifth U.S. Open at Winged Foot and the sixth major championship (1997 PGA Championship won by Davis Love III). Former champions include: Bobby Jones (1929), Billy Casper (1959), Hale Irwin (1974), and Fuzzy Zoeller (1984).

The 1974 edition was known as "The Massacre at Winged Foot," as Irwin won with a seven-over-par 287, and just seven sub-par rounds were recorded over the four days. In the years following World War II, only Julius Boros' 9-over total in high winds in 1963 was a higher winning score. Some thought the difficult set-up in 1974 was in response to Johnny Miller's final round 63 at Oakmont a year earlier.

The U.S. Open returned to Winged Foot fourteen years later in 2020.

Course layout
West Course

Lengths of the course for previous majors:

Field
1. Last 10 U.S. Open Champions
Michael Campbell (8, 10), Ernie Els (4,8), Jim Furyk (9), Retief Goosen (8,9,10), Lee Janzen, Steve Jones, Tiger Woods (3,4,8,9,12)

2. Top two finishers in the 2005 U.S. Amateur
Dillon Dougherty (a), Edoardo Molinari (a)

3. Last five Masters Champions
Phil Mickelson (5,9,12), Mike Weir

4. Last five British Open Champions
Ben Curtis, David Duval, Todd Hamilton

5. Last five PGA Champions
Rich Beem, Shaun Micheel, Vijay Singh (8,9), David Toms (8,9)

6. The Players Champion
Stephen Ames (9,11,12,17)

7. The U.S. Senior Open Champion
Allen Doyle

8. Top 15 finishers and ties in the 2005 U.S. Open
K. J. Choi, Stewart Cink, Tim Clark (9), John Cook, Fred Couples, Bob Estes, Sergio García (9,10), Peter Hedblom, Mark Hensby, Ryuji Imada, Peter Jacobsen, Davis Love III (9), Rocco Mediate, Arron Oberholser, Corey Pavin, Nick Price

9. Top 30 leaders on the 2005 PGA Tour official money list
Stuart Appleby, Olin Browne, Bart Bryant, Mark Calcavecchia, Chad Campbell, Ben Crane, Chris DiMarco, Luke Donald (10), Fred Funk, Lucas Glover, Pádraig Harrington, Tim Herron, Charles Howell III, Brandt Jobe, Justin Leonard, Billy Mayfair, Sean O'Hair, Kenny Perry, Ted Purdy, Adam Scott (15), Scott Verplank

10. Top 15 on the 2005 European Tour Order of Merit
Thomas Bjørn, Ángel Cabrera, Nick Dougherty, Niclas Fasth, Kenneth Ferrie, David Howell, Miguel Ángel Jiménez, Paul McGinley, Colin Montgomerie, José María Olazábal, Henrik Stenson

11. Top 10 on the PGA Tour official money list, as of May 29
Geoff Ogilvy, Rory Sabbatini

12. Winners of multiple PGA Tour events from April 23, 2005 through the 2006 Memorial Tournament
Carl Pettersson

13. Top 2 from the 2006 European Tour Order of Merit, as of May 26
Paul Casey

14. Top 2 on the 2005 Japan Golf Tour official money list, provided they are within the top 75 point leaders of the Official World Golf Rankings at that time
Shingo Katayama

15. Top 2 on the 2005 PGA Tour of Australasia official money list, provided they are within the top 75 point leaders of the Official World Golf Rankings at that time
Nick O'Hern

16. Top 50 on the Official World Golf Rankings list, as of May 30
Robert Allenby, Darren Clarke, Trevor Immelman, Zach Johnson, Tom Lehman, Rod Pampling

17. Special exemptions selected by the USGA
None

Sectional qualifiers
Japan: Keiichiro Fukabori, Tadahiro Takayama, Toru Taniguchi
England: Phillip Archer, Richard Green, Maarten Lafeber, Graeme McDowell, Jyoti Randhawa, Jeev Milkha Singh, Graeme Storm, Oliver Wilson
United States
Daly City, California: Alex Coe (a,L), Michael Derminio (L), Patrick Nagle (a,L), Taylor Wood (L)
Littleton, Colorado: Dustin White (L)
Tampa, Florida: Billy Horschel (a,L), John Koskinen (L), George McNeill (L)
Roswell, Georgia: Jason Dufner (L), Matt Kuchar, Andrew Morse (L), Lee Williams (L)
Koloa, Hawaii: Tadd Fujikawa (a,L)
St. Charles, Illinois: Jason Allred (L), Steve Stricker
Rockville, Maryland: Tommy Armour III, David Berganio Jr., Chad Collins, Joey Sindelar
St. Louis, Missouri: Jay Delsing, Travis Hurst (L)
Summit, New Jersey: Andy Bare (L), Mark Brooks, Brad Fritsch (L), Michael Harris (L), Scott Hend, J. J. Henry, Rob Johnson (L), Kent Jones, Greg Kraft, John Mallinger, Chris Nallen, David Oh (L), Tom Pernice Jr., Brett Quigley, Kevin Stadler, Andrew Svoboda (L), Phil Tataurangi, Nicholas Thompson (L)
Columbus, Ohio: Woody Austin, Craig Barlow, Stephen Gangluff, Mathew Goggin, Nathan Green, Jay Haas, Benjamin Hayes (L), Charley Hoffman, J. B. Holmes, Skip Kendall, Steve Lowery, Ian Poulter, Tag Ridings, John Rollins, Charl Schwartzel, Jeff Sluman, D. J. Trahan, Bo Van Pelt, Camilo Villegas, Duffy Waldorf, Dean Wilson
Galena, Ohio: Madalitso Muthiya (L), Stephen Woodard (L)
Creswell, Oregon: Jonathan Moore (a)
Houston, Texas: Ryan Baca (a,L), Ryan Posey (a,L)

Past champions in the field

Made the cut

Missed the cut

Nationalities in the field

Round summaries

First round
Thursday, June 15, 2006

Colin Montgomerie shot 69 and was the only player under par in the opening round. Phil Mickelson, the winner of the last two majors, was just one shot behind at even-par. Former U.S. Open champion Jim Furyk was also just one shot back. Tiger Woods shot a six over 76 in his first major since his father's death, his worst start ever in a major.

Second round
Friday, June 16, 2006

Steve Stricker led at a major for the first time since 1998 after a one-under 69, and was the only player under par after 36 holes. One stroke back was Montgomerie, while Woods missed the cut at a major as a professional for the first time, ending his record-tying streak of 39 consecutive cuts made at majors. He shot 76 for the second consecutive day missing the cut by three shots. Mickelson struggled throughout the day for 73, which put him four shots back entering 

The best rounds of the day belonged to Arron Oberholser and David Duval who both shot 68. It was the first cut Duval had made at a major since the 2002 PGA Championship. Other notable players missing the cut included Sergio García, Retief Goosen, 1997 PGA Championship winner at Winged Foot Davis Love III, and defending U.S. Open champion Michael Campbell. The cut was at 149 (+9) and better, and no amateurs advanced to the weekend.

Amateurs: Coe (+10), Horschel (+12), Molinari (+13), Moore (+15), Nagle (+16), Fujikawa (+18), Dougherty (+20), Baca (+21), Posey (+22).

Third round
Saturday, June 17, 2006

Following a one-under 69 in the third round, Mickelson shared the 54-hole lead with Kenneth Ferrie, who bogeyed the 18th  Ogilvy made two straight bogeys on the back and finished with a 72 that left him one shot back. Stricker led through much of the front nine but ended up at 76, three shots behind. Pádraig Harrington needed a birdie to catch Mickelson on the 18th hole, but barely made contact out of the deep rough, and moved the ball just  into the fairway. Once out of a greenside bunker, he three-putted for a triple bogey seven and a disappointing 74.

Final round
Sunday, June 18, 2006

In one of the most exciting final rounds in U.S. Open history, Ogilvy survived a brutal final day to win his only major  He took the lead early and led by two strokes after 7 holes, but lost his lead with four bogeys in seven holes. But Ogilvy finished his round with four pars, highlighted by a  chip shot from the second fringe at the 17th. His tee shot on 18 found the fairway but was in a sand-filled divot, and his approach hit the green's false front and rolled back. He dropped a downhill six-footer for his final stroke as all his competitors collapsed around him. Mickelson and Montgomerie needed pars on the final hole to win, or bogeys to tie with Ogilvy, but they both double-bogeyed to hand Ogilvy a dramatic win. He became the first Australian to win a major since Steve Elkington in the 1995 PGA Championship, and the first to win a U.S. Open in a quarter century, since David Graham in 1981.

Montgomerie holed a  putt for birdie on the 17th hole for a share of the lead and was in the middle of the 18th fairway,  from the hole, in prime position to do no worse than a playoff. After an extended wait and much club deliberation, he finally selected a 7-iron and proceeded to miss the green short and right, into deep rough. His difficult chip left a lengthy downhill par putt, and then three-putted for double bogey. Mickelson was in the right rough on the 16th, then the approach plugged into a greenside bunker and he bogeyed. He was well left of the fairway on the 17th into a trash can, but his slicing recovery shot found the green and he two-putted for par. On the 18th tee, Mickelson needed par to win or a bogey to tie, but could not finish off what would have been his third consecutive major championship victory. Using driver, his tee shot went so far left that it clattered through the trees by a hospitality tent. Still trying for par, he went for the green with his second shot but hit a tree, and the ball advanced just . His third faded into the greenside bunker, buried with a "fried-egg" lie; the fourth shot from the sand to win had no spin and rolled off the other side of the green into the rough. Mickelson's chip for bogey and a Monday playoff with Ogilvy rolled six feet past the hole. He tied Sam Snead for the most second-place finishes by a player who has never won the U.S. Open, with four. Furyk needed par to force a playoff and his tee shot was to the left in the intermediate cut; the hooking approach found a greenside bunker and he missed the five-foot putt to save par. Harrington bogeyed the final three holes and finished two strokes behind.  Five different players held the lead at one point on Sunday with 15 different lead changes between them.

Scorecard
Final round

Cumulative tournament scores, relative to par
{|class="wikitable" span = 50 style="font-size:85%;
|-
|style="background: Red;" width=10|
|Eagle
|style="background: Pink;" width=10|
|Birdie
|style="background: PaleGreen;" width=10|
|Bogey
|style="background: Green;" width=10|
|Double bogey
|}
Source:

Quotes
"I still am in shock that I did that. I just can't believe that I did that. I am such an idiot." - Phil Mickelson after double bogeying the 18th hole.

"The biggest reason why this is so disappointing is that this is a tournament that I dreamt of winning as a kid. I spent hours practicing, countless hours practicing, dreaming of winning this tournament. I came out here months in advance to get ready and had it right there in my hand, man. It was right there and I let it go." - Phil Mickelson on losing the U.S. Open.

"I think I was the beneficiary of a little bit of charity." - Geoff Ogilvy after watching from the club house as Furyk, Mickelson and Montgomerie all couldn't make par on the 18th hole.

"I'm disappointed. I played my heart out and it didn't work." - Jim Furyk after runner up finish.

"I love this game." - Geoff Ogilvy after putting out on the 18th hole

"I switched from a 6 to a 7. I thought adrenaline would kick in. I usually hit the ball 10 yards further in that circumstance. I caught it slightly heavy and it went slightly right. It was a poor shot, no question about that, and I put myself into poor position." - Colin Montgomerie on club selection on final hole.

References

External links
 2006 U.S. Open Official Site
 Official Winged Foot website
 ESPN coverage

U.S. Open (golf)
Golf in New York (state)
Mamaroneck, New York
U.S. Open
U.S. Open (golf)
U.S. Open (golf)
U.S. Open (golf)